Ahmet Yılmaz Çalık (26 February 1994 – 11 January 2022) was a Turkish professional footballer who played as a centre-back for Gençlerbirliği, Galatasaray, Konyaspor, and the Turkey national team.

International career
Çalık represented Turkey at the 2013 UEFA U-19 Championship and 2013 FIFA U-20 World Cup.

On 6 November 2015, Çalık was selected for the Turkey national team to play friendlies against Qatar and Greece respectively. He made his debut in a 0–0 draw with Greece. He was part of the Turkish squad for the Euro 2016, but ended up not playing in the tournament.

He scored his first senior international goal in a friendly March 2017 victory over Moldova. This was also his last international game.

Career statistics
Scores and results list Turkey's goal tally first, score column indicates score after each Çalık goal.

Style of play
Çalık was a central centre-back and man-marker, he was athletic and relied mostly on his pace and timing.

Death 
Çalık died in a traffic accident in Ankara on 11 January 2022 at the age of 27.

Honours
Galatasaray
 Süper Lig: 2017–18, 2018–19
 Turkish Cup: 2018–19
 Turkish Super Cup: 2019

References

External links
 
 
 
 

1994 births
2022 deaths
People from Yenimahalle
Association football central defenders
Turkish footballers
Turkey international footballers
Turkey youth international footballers
Turkey under-21 international footballers
UEFA Euro 2016 players
Süper Lig players
Gençlerbirliği S.K. footballers
Galatasaray S.K. footballers
Konyaspor footballers
Road incident deaths in Turkey